Sanjiang is a town in Meilan District, in the southeastern suburbs of Haikou, Hainan, People's Republic of China, and is located  southeast of Haikou Meilan International Airport. , it has one residential community and eight villages under its administration.

See also
List of township-level divisions of Hainan

References

Township-level divisions of Hainan